"So What" is a song released by the South Korean girl group Loona. It was released on February 5, 2020, as the lead single from their mini-album [#]. It earned their first music show win on M! Countdown on March 12.

Background and release 
On December 15, 2019, a teaser title Number 1 or #1 was released. On January 1 at midnight, Loona released a teaser for their EP [#] with the title "Coming Soon". They had previously shared the promotional single "365" from the EP. A few days later on January 10, they released another teaser titled Number 2 or #2, which revealed their comeback date as February 5, 2020. Between January 14 and 19, teaser photos for the group were released, with the first teaser photo of Olivia Hye, and the second of HyunJin. A day later the tracklist for the EP was released, including "So What". On January 23, another teaser titled Number 3 or #3 was released along with teasers for the members being issued between January 24 and 27. The final teasers to be released were "To all LOONA's around the world", a highlight medley, and lastly a teaser for the music video.

Commercial performance
The song debuted at number 89 on the Billboard K-Pop Hot 100 chart becoming their first entry on the chart. On the US World songs chart the song peaked at number 4 becoming their second highest-peaking song on the chart.

Promotion 
On January 8, 2020, Blockberry Creative announced that the leader HaSeul would be sitting out from promotions due to health reasons. On February 5, the day of the song's release, Loona planned to hold a showcase for "So What" at 8:00PM. Due to COVID-19 concerns, on February 2, Blockberry Creative announced that the showcase was canceled for fans, and it would be held without them as planned. On February 25, a few weeks after [#]s release, Loona made their first appearance on Weekly Idol as special guests with Oh My Girl's Seunghee and Hyojung.

Accolades

On March 12, 2020, Loona received their first music show win on Mnet's M Countdown with the song.

Charts

Release history

See also 
 List of M Countdown Chart winners (2020)

References 

2020 songs
2020 singles
Blockberry Creative singles
Loona (group) songs